Solomon Rafailovich Milshtein (1899 – 14 January 1955) was a Soviet state security official.

Solomon Milshtein was born to a family of a Jewish roofer in Vilno, then in the Russian Empire.

Career 
In 1920–1930, as a Bolshevik party apparatchik he worked in Georgia, where he became acquainted with Lavrentiy Beria, then head of the Georgian Communist Party . After Beria became head of NKVD in November 1938, Milshtein in December that year was appointed chief of the Investigative unit of NKVD.

He was arrested in July 1953, shortly after the arrest of Beria. He was tried and executed in January 1955.

1899 births
1955 deaths
Commissars 3rd Class of State Security
Executed Russian people
Recipients of the Order of Kutuzov, 1st class
Recipients of the Order of Kutuzov, 2nd class
Recipients of the Order of Lenin
Recipients of the Order of Suvorov, 2nd class
Recipients of the Order of the Red Banner
Executed Lithuanian people
Lithuanian Jews
Soviet Jews
Jewish socialists
Jews executed by the Soviet Union